LCV can stand for:

Organizations
 League of Conservation Voters

Vehicles and transport
 Airport code of Lucca, Italy
 Low Carbon Vehicle used  in the context of the Low Carbon Vehicle Event
 Landing craft, vehicle
 Light commercial vehicle
 Amtrak station code of Lincolnville, Maine, United States
 Light Combat vehicle
 Long combination vehicle
 Light-weight Combat Vehicle (LCV) System is a wheeled self-propelled artillery of the Japan Ground Self-Defense Force.

Science and technology
 Legionella containing vacuole
 Leuco Crystal Violet, or Crystal Violet Leuco dye
 Leucocytoclastic: medical disorder
 Logical Column Vector, coding
 Lower Calorific Value, synonymous to Lower Heating Value

Business
 Lifetime customer value, in marketing,  a prediction of the net profit attributed to the entire future relationship with a customer. Same as customer lifetime value (CLV) or user lifetime value (ULV).